The legislature of the U.S. state of Alabama has convened many times since statehood became effective on December 14, 1819.

Legislatures

See also
 List of governors of Alabama

References

External links
 
 
 

Legislatures
 
Legislature
alabama
alabama
alabama
alabama